White Canyon Wilderness is a protected wilderness area in the southeastern portion of the Mineral Mountains in the U.S. state of Arizona.  Established in 1990 under the Arizona Desert Wilderness Act the area is managed by the Bureau of Land Management.

The namesake "White Canyon" runs through the middle of the wilderness area in a north-south direction.  A very large escarpment known as the "Rincon" is a prominent landmark in the southern end of the wilderness.  Vegetation in the area includes chaparral variety as well as saguaro cactus typical of the Sonoran Desert that support a variety of wildlife such as black bears and mountain lions.

See also
 List of Arizona Wilderness Areas
 List of U.S. Wilderness Areas

References

IUCN Category Ib
Wilderness areas of Arizona
Protected areas of Pinal County, Arizona
Protected areas established in 1990
1990 establishments in Arizona